Transferability may refer to:
 Transferability (chemistry), an assumption in chemistry regarding atoms
 Transferability (economics), the costs of moving goods from one place to another